These are the Official Charts Company's UK Indie Chart number-one singles of 2014.

Chart history

Notes
 – The single was simultaneously number-one on the singles chart.
Week 33 #1 and #2 was very close the MK song "Always" charted at #41 on the top 100 chart and the Milky Chance song "Stolen Dance" charted at #42 but Milky Chance topped this indie chart. Week 39 was the last time Vance Joy was allowed a place on the chart, meaning Alt-J, The 1975 and Joss Stone reached number one by default.

Number-one Indie artists

See also
List of UK Dance Chart number-one singles of 2014
List of UK R&B Chart number-one singles of 2014
List of UK Rock Chart number-one singles of 2014
List of UK Indie Chart number-one albums of 2014

References

External links
Indie Singles Top 40 at the Official Charts Company
UK Top 30 Indie Singles Chart at BBC Radio 1

2014 in British music
United Kingdom Indie Singles
Indie 2014